Brian Riordan (born 1974) is a three-time Grammy and four-time Emmy Award-winning re-recording mixer, music mixer, musician, and entrepreneur. He is the founder and CEO of Levels Audio located in Hollywood, California.

Awards 
Nominations are listed below. Awards won are listed in bold.

Grammy Awards 
 Equanimity & The Bird Revelation (2018) Best Comedy Album: Re-recording Mixer 
 Sticks & Stones (2019) Best Comedy Album: Re-recording Mixer 
 The Closer (2020) Best Comedy Album: Re-recording Mixer

Primetime Emmy Awards 
Awards and nominations 
 American Idol (2003) Outstanding Sound Mixing For Nonfiction Programming (Single Or Multi-Camera): Re-Recording Mixer
 The 76th Annual Academy Awards (2004) Outstanding Sound Mixing for a Variety Or Music Series Or Special: Re-Recording Mixer
 American Idol (2005) Outstanding Sound Mixing For Nonfiction Programming (Single Or Multi-camera): Post-Sound mixer
 American Idol Finale (2005) Outstanding Sound Mixing For A Variety Or Music Series Or Special Or Animation: Re-Recording Mixer
 American Idol (2006) Outstanding Sound Mixing For A Variety Or Music Series Or Special Or Animation: Re-Recording Mixer
 American Idol Finale (2008) Outstanding Sound Mixing For A Variety Or Music Series Or Special: Pre-Production Packages Mixer
 American Idol (2009) Outstanding Sound Mixing For Nonfiction Programming: Re-Recording Mixer
 81st Annual Academy Awards (2009) Outstanding Sound Mixing For A Variety Or Music Series Or Special: Pre-Production Packages Mixer
 American Idol Finale (2009) Outstanding Sound Mixing For A Variety Or Music Series Or Special: Pre-Production Packages Mixer
 Flight of The Conchords (2009) Outstanding Sound Mixing For A Comedy Or Drama Series (Half-Hour) And Animation: Re-Recording Mixer
 25th Anniversary Rock and Roll Hall of Fame Concert (2010) Outstanding Sound Mixing for a Variety or Music Series or Special: Re-Recording Mixer
 American Idol (2010) Outstanding Sound Mixing for a Variety or Music Series or Special: Re-Recording Mixer
 American Idol Finale (2010) Outstanding Sound Mixing for a Variety or Music Series or Special: Re-Recording Mixer
 82nd Annual Academy Awards (2010) Outstanding Sound Mixing for a Variety or Music Series or Special: Re-Recording Mixer
 American Idol (2011) Outstanding Sound Mixing for a Variety or Music Series or Special: Re-Recording Mixer
 84th Annual Academy Awards (2012) Outstanding Sound Mixing for a Variety or Music Series or Special: Re-Recording Mixer
 American Idol (2012) Outstanding Sound Mixing for a Variety or Music Series or Special: Re-Recording Mixer
 American Idol (2013) Outstanding Sound Mixing for a Variety or Music Series or Special: Re-Recording Mixer
 The Voice (2015) Outstanding Sound Mixing for a Variety Series or Special: Re-Recording Mixer
 The Voice (2016) Outstanding Sound Mixing for a Variety Series or Special: Re-Recording Mixer
 The Voice (2017) Outstanding Sound Mixing for a Variety Series or Special: Re-Recording Mixer
 Dave Chappelle: Sticks and Stones (2020) Outstanding Sound Mixing for a Variety Series or Special: Re-Recording Mixer

Daytime Emmy Awards  
 Disney Parks Christmas Day Parade (2012) Outstanding Live and Direct to Tape Sound Mixing: Post-Production Mixer 
 Disney Parks Christmas Day Parade (2013) Outstanding Live and Direct to Tape Sound Mixing: Post-Production Mixer

Cinema Audio Society Awards 
 American Idol: Season 7 Finale (2009) Outstanding Achievement in Sound Mixing for 2008: Television Non-Fiction, Variety or Music Series or Special: Re-recording Mixer
 Lady Gaga Monster Ball Tour (2011) Outstanding Achievement in Sound Mixing for Television Non-Fiction, Variety or Music Series or Specials: Re-recording mixer
 2012 Rock and Roll Hall of Fame Induction Ceremony (2012) Outstanding Achievement in Sound Mixing for Television Non-Fiction, Variety or Music Series or Specials: Re-Recording Mixer
 They'll Love Me When I'm Dead (2019) Outstanding Achievement in Sound Mixing for Motion Picture Documentary: Re-recording Mixer

TEC Awards 

 Outstanding Creative Achievement in Television Sound Production (2006) American Idol 
 Outstanding Creative Achievement in Television Sound Production (2007) American Idol 
 Outstanding Creative Achievement in Studio Design (2007) Levels Audio 
 Outstanding Creative Achievement in Television Sound Production (2009) American Idol 
 Outstanding Creative Achievement in Television Sound Production (2011) American Idol 
 Outstanding Creative Achievement in Television Sound Production (2012) American Idol 
 Studio Design Project for Mix 8 and 9 (2018) Levels Audio

Gopo Awards 
The Rest is Silence (2009) Best Sound in a Film

References

External links 
 Levels Audio
 

American audio engineers
Berklee College of Music alumni
Living people
Year of birth missing (living people)